The Statuto Albertino (English: Albertine Statute) was the constitution granted by King Charles Albert of Sardinia to the Kingdom of Sardinia on 4 March 1848 and written in Italian and French. The Statute later became the constitution of the unified Kingdom of Italy and remained in force, with changes, until 1948. Charles Albert did not want to grant a Constitutional Charter so he attempted to maintain as much power as he could although the Statute marked the end of his absolute monarchy.

Background

The Statute was proclaimed only because of concern at the revolutionary insurrection agitating Italy in 1848. At the time, Charles Albert was only following the example of other Italian rulers, but his Statute was the only constitution to survive the repression that followed the First War of Independence (1848–49). The Statute remained the basis of the legal system after Italian unification was achieved in 1860 and the Kingdom of Sardinia became the Kingdom of Italy. Even though it suffered deep modifications, especially during the fascist government of Benito Mussolini (who ruled with the tacit approval of King Victor Emmanuel III), the Statute lasted mostly unaltered in the structure until the implementation of the republican constitution in 1948, which superseded several primary features of the document, with specific regard to those of monarchical nature.

Provisions

Preamble
The preamble of the Statute consists of an enacting formula that reaffirms the authority of the King, in the context of the unrest that was sweeping across Europe and the Kingdom, by stating:

CARLO ALBERTO, by the grace of God, KING OF SARDINIA, OF CYPRUS, AND OF JERUSALEM Etc., Etc., Etc.With regal loyalty and fatherly love We come today to accomplish what We had announced to Our most beloved subjects with Our proclamation of the 8th of the February last, with which We wanted to demonstrate, in the midst of the extraordinary events which  surround the country, how Our confidence in them increases with the gravity of the circumstances and, heeding only of the impulses of Our heart,  how determined is Our intention to adapt their destiny to the spirit of the times,  for the interest and for the dignity of the Nation.

Having considered the broad and strong representative institutions contained in the present Fundamental Statute to be the most certain means of  redoubling with the links of indissoluble affection that bind to Our Italian Crown a  People who have given Us so many proofs of faith, of obedience and of love, We have determined to sanction it and to promulgate it, in the faith that God will bless Our intentions, and that the free, strong and happy Nation will always show itself  ever more worthy of its ancient fame and will deserve a glorious future. For this reason, by  Our certain Royal authority, having had the opinion of Our Concil, We have ordered and We do order with the force of  Statute and fundamental Law, perpetual and irrevocable from the Monarchy, that which follows:

The State (Articles 1–23)

The Statute starts by establishing Roman Catholicism as the sole state religion while freedom of religion was granted for all existing forms of worship, in conformity with the law (Article No.1). The Kingdom of Italy was a representative monarchy, with an hereditary crown, in accordance with the Salic law, which effectively limited succession to male members of the royal family (Article No.2). Legislative power was exercised collectively by the King, the Senate and the Chamber of Deputies (Article No.3). Executive power was vested in the King alone (Article No.5), who was declared to be "sacred and inviolable" (Article No.4).

Among the powers of the King were the capacity to 
 declare war, as commander-in-chief of all the armed forces.
 conclude treaties of peace, of alliance, of commerce and others. He was required to notify the Chambers of these treaties except in circumstances where vital state interests and national security concerns forbade it. However, treaties entailing either a financial burden or changes in the territories of the State had to be ratified by the Chambers.
 appoint all state officials.
 sign bills into law and promulgate them, as well as issue the decrees and regulations necessary for their execution. The Article No.7 also gave the King the ability to withhold countersignature, however, Kings never used this power because they feared unpopularity might cause the end of the monarchy.
 propose new legislation, a power shared with the Chambers.  However, taxation and appropriations bills were required to originate in the Chamber of Deputies.
 annually convene the Chambers, prorogue them and dissolve the Chamber of Deputies, with the proviso that a new Chamber must be convened within four months of its dissolution.
 grant clemency and commute sentences.

The King reached majority at the age of eighteen. During his minority, the prince most closely related to him in accordance with the order of succession served as regent to the throne and tutor of the King, taking this last duty from the Queen Mother after the King turned seven. If that prince was younger than 21, these duties passed to the next in line, until the King reached majority. In the absence of male relatives, the Queen Mother served as regent. If there was no Queen Mother, the ministers were required to convene the Chambers within ten days to name a regent. The same procedures applied in the event of physical incapacity of the reigning King, but if the crown prince was already of age, he automatically became regent.

The Statute established the economic benefits and privileges of the Crown and the members of the royal family, reaffirming also the King's ownership of His assets, which included royal palaces, villas and gardens, as well as all His personal properties. Of these assets the Statute mandated an inventory to be compiled and regularly updated by the responsible Minister.

During the coronation, the King was required to swear before both Chambers to act in accordance with the Statute, while the regent was required to swear loyalty to the King and the Statute.

The Rights and Duties of Citizens (Articles 24–32)

The Statute declared all citizens equal before the law, with equal civil and political rights regardless of ranks and titles, and made all citizens eligible for civil and military offices, except for the restrictions provided by the law.  All citizens were required to pay taxes in proportion to their possessions.

The Statute did not explicitly exclude women from the right to vote (Article No.24), this led to controversies as Courts disagreed with each other until the precedent of the Supreme Court forbidding women to vote.

The Statute granted the rights of habeas corpus, guaranteeing personal liberty and inviolability of the residence. Nobody could be arrested or brought to trial, or have his home searched, except in those cases and in the manners prescribed by the law. All properties were inviolable. However, if public interest mandated it, citizens could be required to give up all or part of their property with due compensation and in accordance with the law.

Freedom of the press was granted, but the government was empowered to punish abuses of this freedom.  Moreover, the Statute granted the Bishops the sole authority to grant permission to print bibles, catechisms, liturgical and prayer books until 1870.  Citizens had the right to freely assemble, peacefully and unarmed (the right to keep and bear arms was not recognised), though the government could regulate this right in the interest of public welfare.  However, assemblies in public places were still subjected to police regulation.

Taxes could not be levied or collected without the consent of the Chambers and the King.  The public debt is guaranteed and every obligation of the State to its creditors had to be met.

The Senate (Articles 33–38)

Senators were appointed by the King for life, and had to be at least 40 years old. The Statute gave a list of different categories among which senators were chosen, with different criteria and requirements for each category. The list included Archbishops and Bishops of the State; Presidents and members of the Chamber of Deputies; Ministers of the State; Ambassadors and Special Envoys; Presidents, Attorneys and Councillors of the Court of Cassation, the Court of Accounts or the Appeal Courts; Generals and Admirals; State Councillors; Members of the Royal Academy of Science and of the High Council of Public Education; and other citizens who have distinguished themselves through their services, achievements and contributions. The Royal Princes were members of the Senate by right from the age of 21 onward, with full voting rights after the age of 25, sitting immediately after the President.

The President and the Vice-President of the Senate were appointed by the King, while the Secretaries were chosen by the Senate. By Royal decree, the Senate could be empowered to sit as a High Court of Justice to judge crimes of high treason and other crimes against national security, and to judge ministers accused by the Chamber of Deputies. In these circumstances, the Senate did not constitute a political entity and had only focus on the judicial affairs for which it was convened.

No senator could be arrested without an order of the Senate, except when they were apprehended in flagrante delicto.  The Senate had the sole authority to judge its members, and was also responsible for archiving royal births, marriages and deaths.

The Chamber of Deputies (Articles 39–47)

The Chamber of Deputies was popularly elected, and was composed of members chosen from their constituencies in conformity with the law. Deputies were required to be Italian subjects, at least 30 years old, enjoy civil and political rights and fulfill all other requirements established by the law. Deputies were elected for at least five years, unless the Chamber was dissolved before then, and they represented the nation as a whole, with no binding mandate from their individual constituencies.

The Chamber of Deputies elected its own President, Vice-President and Secretaries at the beginning of each session for its entire duration. If a Deputy ceased, for whatever reason, to fulfill his functions, new elections were required to be held in his constituency as soon as possible.

No Deputy could be arrested while the Chamber is in session, except when apprehended in flagrante delicto, nor could he be brought before a court in a criminal proceeding without the prior consent of the Chamber. A Deputy could not be arrested for indebtedness while the Chamber was in session, nor during the three weeks immediately preceding and following a session.

The Chamber had the right to impeach the King's Ministers and bring them to trial before the High Court of Justice, which was the Senate.

Provisions Common to Both Chambers (Articles 48–64)

The sessions of the Chambers were required to start and finish at the same time. Any meeting of one chamber convened while the other was out of session was illegal, and its proceedings were null and void.

Before taking office, Senators and Deputies took an oath to be loyal to the King, to loyally observe the Statute and the laws of the State, and to exercise their functions with the sole aim of the inseparable good of the King and of the nation.

Senators and deputies served without pay. They could not be held accountable for opinions expressed and votes given in the Chambers. Sittings of the Chambers were public, but they could deliberate in closed session when requested in written form by ten members.

An absolute majority of members of each chamber had to be present for the sitting to be legal. Deliberations were taken by majority vote. All bills had to be examined by the committees, and had to be approved article by article by both Chambers before being transmitted to the King for his approval. If a bill was rejected in either Chamber or vetoed by the King, it could not be reintroduced during the same session.

Every citizen over the age of 21 had the right to send petitions to the Chambers by way of the proper authorities. The petitions were then examined by the Chambers through their committees to determine if they were worthy of consideration. If they were considered worthy, they were sent to the responsible Minister or offices. The Senate and Chamber of Deputies could only hear from their own Members, the Ministers and the Government's Commissioners. Each Chamber had the sole authority to judge the validity and eligibility of its own members, and to establish its own internal rules regarding the exercise of its functions.

No one could be a Senator and a Deputy at the same time. Voting could be done by standing and sitting, by division into groups or by secret ballot, the last being mandatory while voting on a bill in its entirety, or on provisions personally concerning the Members.

Italian was defined as the working language of both chambers. However, members could use French if they represented areas in which it is used, or in response to the same.

The Ministers (Articles 65–67)

The King appointed and dismissed the Ministers. They could not vote in either Chamber unless they were members. They had the right of entrance to both Chambers and the right to speak upon request. Ministers were legally responsible for government acts, and all laws and acts had to be countersigned by a Minister in order to take effect.

Originally, ministers were responsible only to the King. However, as the power and prestige of the Chambers grew over the years, it became virtually impossible for a King to appoint a ministry entirely of his own choosing, or keep it in office against the express will of the Chambers. As a result, contradicting the Statute, it became a well-established convention that ministers were both legally and politically responsible to the Chambers. This convention was so firmly established that when Benito Mussolini consolidated his power, he passed a law explicitly stating that he was not responsible to the Chambers.

The Statute granted the King the power to appoint and dismiss ministers (Article 65) and they could not, in theory unlike in practice, be removed because the executive power belonged to the King alone (Article 5); Victor Emmanuel III was the first and the last to make use of the large might of the Constitution by appointing Mussolini.

The Judiciary (Articles 68–73)
The King appointed all judges, who administered justice in his name. Except for cantonal judges, judges were irremovable after three years of service.

The Statute provided for the retention of all courts, tribunals, and judges that existed at the time it came into force. The judicial organization could only be altered by legislation. No one could be withdrawn from his ordinary legal jurisdiction. Consequently, no extraordinary tribunals or commissions could be created.

Proceedings of tribunals in civil matters and hearings in criminal matters were public, in conformity with the law. The courts did not exercise judicial review, as the interpretation of laws was the responsibility of the legislature.

General Provisions (Articles 74–81)
The law regulated the institutions of the Provinces and Comuni, as well as their districts. The law also regulated the military service and the communal militia. All laws contrary to the Statute were declared void.

The State retained the flag and the existing Orders of Knighthood, with their privileges in their own institutions, while the King could create new Orders and establish their statutes. Titles of nobility were maintained by those with a right to them, while the King could confer new ones. No one could receive decorations, titles, or pensions from a foreign power without the authorization of the King.

Transitory Provisions (Articles 82–84)
The Statute took effect on the day of the first meeting of the Chambers, which was required to take place immediately after the election. Until then, public service was provided by urgent and sovereign dispositions in the forms that were followed before the adoption of the Statute.

For the execution of the Statute, the King reserved the right to make laws on the press, on the elections, on the communal militia and the rearrangement of the State Council. Until the publication of the laws on the press, the previous laws remained in effect.

The Ministers were appointed and responsible for the execution and the full observance of the transitional dispositions.

Reactions 
The subjects of the Kingdom celebrated for the first time the grant of the Constitution on 27 February 1848 but the day of celebration later became the first Sunday of June. This national day originally meant to represent the achievement of liberty but by time the national day was seen as a celebration to the monarchy itself, and continued to be seen in the same way even after Benito Mussolini acquired power.

See also
Constitution of Italy
Lateran Treaty

References

External links
Text of the Statute  
Text of the Statute 
Text of the Statute (annotated PDF translation)

19th century in Italy
1848 in Italy
1848 in law
Legal history of Italy
Italy
Kingdom of Sardinia
1848 in the Kingdom of Sardinia
Constitution of Italy
1848 documents
Italian constitutional law